Kosmos 26 ( meaning Cosmos 26), also known as DS-MG No.1 was a scientific satellite which was launched by the Soviet Union in 1964. This mission studied the Earth's magnetic field and, along with Kosmos 49, represented the USSR contribution to the International Quiet Solar Year World Magnetic Survey. The corresponding American measurements were performed by the satellites OGO 2 and OGO 4.

It was launched aboard a Kosmos-2I 63S1 rocket from Mayak-2 at Kapustin Yar. The launch occurred at 15:07 GMT on 18 March 1964.

It decayed from orbit on 28 September 1964. Kosmos 26 was the first of two DS-MG satellites to be launched, the other being Kosmos 49.

See also

 1964 in spaceflight

References

Spacecraft launched in 1964
Kosmos 0026
1964 in the Soviet Union
Spacecraft which reentered in 1964
Dnepropetrovsk Sputnik program